Barbodes pachycheilus is an extinct species of cyprinid fish endemic to Lake Lanao in Mindanao, the Philippines.  This species reached a length of  TL.

References

Barbodes
Endemic fauna of the Philippines
Fauna of Mindanao
Fish described in 1924

Freshwater fish of the Philippines